Diolcogaster ichiroi is a species of parasitoid wasps within the family Braconidae.  The species name was chosen in reference to Ichiro Suzuki, a professional baseball player.  The species has only been collected at the Archbold Biological Station in Highlands County, Florida and the true extent of its range is not known.

References 

Insects described in 2018
Microgastrinae